The following is a list of the MTV Europe Music Award winners and nominees for Best Nordic Act.

Winners and nominees

1990s

2000s

2020s

MTV Select — Northern

The award has been replaced from 2005 to 2019 by:
 MTV Europe Music Award for Best Danish Act
 MTV Europe Music Award for Best Finnish Act
 MTV Europe Music Award for Best Norwegian Act
 MTV Europe Music Award for Best Swedish Act

References

MTV Europe Music Awards
Danish music awards
Finnish music awards
Norwegian music awards
Swedish music awards
Scandinavian culture
Awards established in 1999